Alexander  or Alex Cannon may refer to:

Alex Cannon (Big Brother)
Alex Cannon, producer on Surrogate Valentine
Alexander Cannon (general), Scottish soldier
Alexander Cannon (psychiatrist), British psychiatrist
Zander Cannon, American cartoonist